Metarhizium brunneum, is the re-instated name of a group of reassigned Metarhizium isolates, previously grouped in the species "Metarhizium anisopliae var. anisopliae": based on a multigene phylogenetic approach using near-complete sequences from nuclear DNA. It is a mitosporic fungus with asexual reproduction, which was formerly classified in the form class Hyphomycetes of the form phylum Deuteromycota (also often called Fungi Imperfecti). M. brunneum has been isolated from Coleoptera, Lepidoptera, Diptera and soil samples, but a commercially developed isolate (below) has proved virulent against Hemiptera and Thysanoptera.

Genome 
The genome of M. brunneum was the first in the genus to be completely assembled. The 7 chromosomes and mitogenome have a total sequence length of 37,796,881. The sequencing and assembly was performed at Swansea University in 2021.

Standard isolate and characteristics 
Bischoff et al.[1] state: "There is no viable ex-type culture for M. brunneum Petch. However ARSEF 2107 (from Oregon, USA) is considered an authentic strain because the taxon's author, Petch, identified it and we designate it here as an ex-epitype. ... an ex-epitype (BPI 878297) derived from a living culture (ARSEF 1914) is designated for this taxon."  Metarhizium brunneum is the most basal lineage in the clade called 'PARB' in which it appears impossible to differentiate isolates of M. brunneum from M. anisopliae, on morphological characteristics alone (with the exception of the presumptive colour mutant ARSEF 2107).

Conidia typically measure 4.5–8.0 μm long x 2.0–3.0 μm diameter: similar to several other Metarhizuim species. Petch designated a type collection from the Philippines, which he described as turning brown in mature colonies. This colour variant may occur regularly in nature based on the fact that Petch had identified a number of isolates as M. brunneum from geographically distant locations. However it is important to note that the majority of M. brunneum isolates examined by Bischoff et al. were olive-green in colour (similar to M. anisopliae), rather than the buff and tan pigmentation described for the type specimen and the ex-epitype cultures, respectively.

Applications

Varroa mite (honeybees) 
In 2021, a custom-bred strain of M. brunneum was created to target and kill the varroa mite that afflicts honeybee populations. That strain was bred to be heat-tolerant, raising the percentage of spores that germinated at 35 °C—the temperature of a typical beehive— from 44% to 70%. A second breeding effort increased the deadliness of the strain from 4% just over 60%.

Important isolates 

 Isolate  M.a. 43 (a.k.a. F52, Met52, 029056) primarily infects beetle larvae: and is the active ingredient of 'BIO 1020', originally developed for control of Otiorhynchus sulcatus and now 'Met52'; it is still often described in commercial literature as "M. anisopliae". Commercial products based on this isolate are subcultures of the individual isolate M.a. 43 and are represented in several culture collections including: Julius Kühn-Institute for Biological Control (previously the BBA), Darmstadt, Germany: [M.a. 43]; HRI, UK: [275-86 (acronyms V275 or KVL 275)]; KVL Denmark [KVL 99-112 (Ma 275 or V 275)]; Bayer, Germany [DSM 3884]; ATCC, USA [ATCC 90448]; USDA, Ithaca, USA [ARSEF 1095]. Granular and emulsifiable concentrate formulations based on this isolate have been developed by several companies and registered in the EU and N. America (US and Canada) for use against black vine weevil in nursery ornamentals and soft fruit, other Coleoptera, western flower thrips in greenhouse ornamentals and chinch bugs in turf.

See also

 Biological insecticides

References

External links
 Index Fungorum record, links to a list of synonyms

Clavicipitaceae
Parasitic fungi
Fungi described in 1935
Taxa named by Thomas Petch